The United States Senate election of 1950 in New York was held on November 7, 1950. Incumbent Democratic Senator Herbert H. Lehman was re-elected to a full term in office over Republican Joe Hanley.

This election is also noted for the campaign of African-American cultural and civil rights icon W. E. B. Du Bois, who ran at age 82 on the American Labor Party ticket.

General election

Candidates
 W. E. B. DuBois, African-American icon and co-founder of the NAACP (American Labor)
 Stephen Emery, Socialist Labor nominee for Vice President in 1948 (Socialist Labor)
 Joe Hanley, Lieutenant Governor of New York (Republican)
 Joseph Hansen, Trotskyist activist (Socialist Workers)
 Herbert H. Lehman, incumbent Senator (Democratic)

Results

References

1950
New York
1950 New York (state) elections